is a Japanese voice actor in numerous anime and non-anime works. He is most known for his role as Saïx of Organization XIII (Kingdom Hearts II) and as Jin (Samurai Champloo), who are both voiced by Kirk Thornton in their respective English dubs.

Notable voice roles 
 Saïx in Kingdom Hearts II
 Saïx in Kingdom Hearts 358/2 Days
 Isa in Kingdom Hearts Birth by Sleep
 Jin in Samurai Champloo
 Hirayama Yukio in Akagi
 Shun in Be Rockin'
 Turk (Two Guns) in Last Order: Final Fantasy VII

Sources 
 

1977 births
Japanese male voice actors
Living people